Ceylon competed at the 1956 Summer Olympics in Melbourne, Australia.

Athletics

High jump
Nagalingam Ethirveerasingam
Finals

Boxing

 Chandrasena Jayasuriya
 Hempala Jayasuriya

References
 Official Olympic Reports
 Sri Lanka at the 1956 Melbourne Summer Games

Nations at the 1956 Summer Olympics
1956
1956 in Ceylon